Belletti is a surname. Notable people with the surname include:

Giovanni Belletti (1813–1890), Italian opera singer
Giulio Belletti (born 1957), Italian volleyball player
Juliano Belletti (born 1976), Brazilian footballer
Manuel Belletti (born 1985), Italian cyclist
Paolo Belletti (17th century), Italian scientific instrument maker

See also
Belletto